Sharik ibn Hudayr al-Taghlibi was a companion of Ali and fought for him in Battle of Siffin. He was also very close to the Malik al-Ashtar. According to some traditions, he was killed by Husayn ibn Numayr in a fight with Ubayd Allah ibn Ziyad with al-Mukhtar al-Thaqafi.

References

Companions of the Prophet